This is a list of public holidays in Norfolk Island

See also
Public holidays in Australia

References

External links

Norfolk Island culture
Norfolk Island
Public holidays in Australia